William DeJarnette Quesenberry (March 10, 1828 – December 8, 1901) was a Democratic politician who served as a member of the Virginia Senate, eventually rising to become president pro tempore of that body. He later served one term in the Virginia House of Delegates.

References

External links

1828 births
1901 deaths
Democratic Party Virginia state senators
19th-century American politicians
People from Caroline County, Virginia
Confederate States Army officers
Military personnel from Virginia